Lovecraft Biofuels was a Silverlake, California operation that claimed typical diesel engines could run on vegetable oil using what is known as a "single tank" conversion. They can run on either diesel, filtered waste vegetable oil, new vegetable oil, or any combination thereof. Some versions do not heat the vegetable oil which may compromise filtering quality. With the success of converting diesel engines to using biofuels, home-made scam conversion kits of questionable quality were installed in old, inexpensive diesel cars and resold in more favorable alternative fuel markets. 

It was featured on the History Channel's show Modern Marvels: Renewable Energy Sources

References and external links

External links

Official website

Companies based in Los Angeles County, California